Rave On Buddy Holly is a compilation album by various artists released on June 28, 2011, through Fantasy Records/Concord Music Group and Hear Music. A tribute album to musician Buddy Holly, who died in a plane crash in 1959 at age 22, the title refers to the song "Rave On", one of his biggest hits. Contributing artists included Paul McCartney, who owned Holly's publishing catalog at the time of the album's release, and Graham Nash, a former member of The Hollies, who were named in commemoration of Holly.

Critical reception of the compilation album was positive overall; many reviewers appreciated the album in its entirety but criticized select performances. Rave On Buddy Holly reached a peak position of number 15 on the Billboard 200 and also charted on the Top Canadian Albums, Top Digital Albums and Top Rock Albums charts. "Dearest", performed by The Black Keys, received a nomination for Best Pop Duo/Group Performance at the 54th Grammy Awards (2012).

A similar 75th birthday tribute album, Listen to Me: Buddy Holly, was issued just over two months later.  It contained a similar range of songs, but by a different group of artists—although Zooey Deschanel appears on both albums (as a solo artist on Listen to Me and as a member of She & Him on Rave On).

Composition

The album opens with The Black Keys' "Dearest", just over two minutes in length. Cee Lo Green's vocals on "(You're So Square) Baby I Don't Care" last just ninety-three seconds; the song has a total length of just over one minute and thirty seconds.

Reception

Overall, critical reception of the album was positive, though many reviewers criticized select tracks. Allmusic's Stephen Thomas Erlewine complimented the artists involved for not settling for "mere replications" of Holly's song, for playing "fast and loose", and for "radically reinterpreting the original" recordings. However, Erlewine described Karen Elson's cover of "Crying, Waiting, Hoping" as "overly ornate" and categorized Lou Reed's "Peggy Sue" as "turgid grind". David Fricke of Rolling Stone lauded McCartney's "It's So Easy" and Nash's "Raining in My Heart", describing the latter as a "deft balance of folk-rock sparkle and overcast-afternoon sigh". Fricke also appreciated the contributions by Nick Lowe, Justin Townes Earle, and especially Patti Smith's "Words of Love", which he claimed was delivered as a "precious wish" just as Holly had written. BBC Music contributor Mischa Pearlman complimented performances by Smith, Lou Reed, Cee Lo Green, and Julian Casablancas, as well as Kid Rock's "soulful" cover and Modest Mouse's "hushed reimagining" of "That'll Be the Day". Pearlman also criticized McCartney's performance, writing that he "trie[d] a little too hard", and was disappointed by Fiona Apple and Jon Brion's cover for sounding "almost a carbon copy" of the original. She summarized the album as a "wonderful testament to [Holly's] songwriting prowess, longevity and legacy".

Paste magazine's Jeff Gonick positive review highlighted The Black Keys' "beautifully minimalist" cover, Casablancas' "rich and rocky" title track, My Morning Jacket's "beautifully crafted croon", as well as Modest Mouse's performance. Marc Hogan of Spin magazine gave Rave On Buddy Holly an eight rating on a ten-point scale and described Green's performance as "so good it'll give you hiccups". The Washington Post'''s Allison Stewart preferred artists whose performances were more similar to the original, including Apple, Elson and Earle; she criticized Modest Mouse and McCartney, whose covers differed greatly from the original, though she complimented Kid Rock's "Detroit soul rave-up" despite its differences. NPR contributor Stephen Thompson wrote a positive review of the album, claiming that the featured musicians "prove to be a nice fit for Holly's timeless words and tunes" and "give this collection the sweetness its source material demands, without losing sight of the melancholy that lies beneath." One reviewer for The Salt Lake Tribune expressed similar sentiment, describing the album as a "fitting, often avant-garde and unusually fun tip of the hat to one of the best penners of melodies ever", specifically highlighting contributions by Green and McCartney.

Track listing

Personnel

 Rob Ackroyd – guitar
 C. C. Adcock – guitar, mixing, percussion, producer
 Jerry Allison – composer
 Laurie Anderson – electric violin
 Rusty Anderson – backing vocals
 Fiona Apple – vocals
 Dan Auerbach – guitar, mixing, organ, vocals
 Johnny Badanjek – drums
 The Black Keys – arranger, producer
 Jake Blanton – bass, guitar, mixing, producer
 Tommy Brenneck – 6-string electric bass, arranger, electric guitar, engineer, keyboards, mixing, slide guitar
 Jon Brion – acoustic guitar, backing vocals, electric guitar, percussion, producer
 Isaac Brock – guitar, vocals
 Boudleaux Bryant – composer
 Felice Bryant – composer
 Greg Calbi – mastering
 Sarth Calhoun – bass
 Patrick Carney – drums
 Justin Carpenter – piano
 Julian Casablancas – vocals
 Eric Caudieux – editing
 Ali Chant – assistant
 Keefus Ciancia – upright piano
 Larissa Collins – art direction
 Bob D'Amico – drums
 Jay Dee Daugherty – drums, percussion
 Zooey Deschanel – vocals
 John Doe – vocals
 Steve Donnelly – guitar
 Karen Elson – vocals
 Dave Feeny – mixing
 Dave Ferguson – acoustic bass, engineer, mixing
 Ryan Freeland – engineer, mixing
 Bob Gibson – composer
 Rich Gilbert – guitar
 Bryce Goggin – engineer
 Mike Green – drums
 Andrew Greene – trumpet
 The Grey Area – producer
 Christopher Hayden – drums, percussion
 Roy Hendrickson – engineer
 Joe Henry – producer
 Terrence Higgens – drums, percussion
 Jimmy Hole – package layout
 Buddy Holly – composer
 Aaron Johnson – trombone
 Clay Jones – engineer, producer
 David Kahne – engineer, mixing, producer
 David Kalish – engineer, Hammond B3
 Fats Kaplin – fiddle
 Lenny Kaye – acoustic guitar
 David Kemper – drums
 Julia Kent – strings
 Kid Rock – engineer, vocal harmony, vocals
 Steve "Doc Ching" King – engineer
 Rob Kleiner – engineer, percussion, piano, snaps
 Greg Koller – engineer, mixing
 Abe Laboriel Jr. – backing vocals, drums
 Dawn Landes – engineer
 Jerry Leiber – composer
 Stewart Lerman – engineer, mixing, producer
 Greg Lesiz – electric guitar
 Fernando Lodeiro – assistant, assistant engineer
 Nick Lowe – acoustic guitar, vocals
 Benji Lysaght – guitar
 Graham Marsh (producer) – acoustic guitar, bass guitar, clapping, engineer, mixing, programming
 Mary Ramirez – guitar
 Chris Masterson – backing vocals, guitar
 Joe Mauldin – composer
 Gary Maurer – mixing
 Joey Mazzola – guitar
 Val McCallum – electric guitar
 Paul McCartney – acoustic guitar, producer, vocals
 Ellas McDaniel – composer
 Scott McPherson – drums
 Konrad Meissner – backing vocals, drums
 Leon Michaels – tenor saxophone
 Lisa Molinaro – viola
 Bob Montgomery – composer
 Rob Moose – strings
 Chris Morrissey – backing vocals, bass
 Rob Morsberger – Hammond B3, organ (pump)
 Nick Movshon – bass guitar
 Jenni Muldaur – backing vocals
 Rachel Nagy – vocals
 Mike Napolitano – mixing
 Graham Nash – Fender Rhodes, percussion, vocals
 William Nash – producer
 Steve Nawara – bass
 Ivan Neville – Wurlitzer
 Jenny O. – percussion, producer, vocals
 John Parish – mixing
 Matt Perine – sousaphone, upright bass
 Norman Petty – composer
 David Piltch – bass
 Prentice Herman Polk Jr. – composer
 John Porter – engineer
 Randall Poster – compilation producer, liner notes
 Vance Powell – engineer, mixing
 Matt Radford – bass
 Bret Rausch – production coordination
 Brian Ray – backing vocals
 James Raymond – arranger, engineer, mixing, piano, producer, programming
 Lou Reed – engineer, guitar, mixing, producer, vocals
 Gelya Robb – compilation producer
 Chris Scruggs – pedal steel
 Adam Selzer – engineer
 Gus Seyffert – mixing
 Tony Shanahan – baritone guitar, double bass, organ (pump), producer, sitar, vocals
 Joshua V. Smith – assistant engineer, mixing assistant
 Patti Smith – vocals
 Sebastian Steinberg – bass
 Homer Steinweiss – arranger, drums
 Mike Stoller – composer
  Bryon Steward - Piano
 Niki Sullivan – composer
 Sean Sullivan – engineer
 Isabella Summers – piano
 Matt Sweeney – arranger, backing vocals, electric bass, electric guitar, guitar, mixing, producer, vocal harmony
 The Tall Boyz – arranger, mixing
 Jared Tankel – baritone saxophone
 Benmont Tench – celeste
 Bill Tilghman – composer
 Entcho Todoro – strings
 Alex Carlos Toval – assistant engineer
 Robert Trehern – drums
 Marc Urselli – engineer, mixing
 M. Ward – guitar, producer
 Joan Wasser – string arrangements, strings
 Mark Watrous – Bas Dessus
 Benjamin Weikel – drums
 Florence Welch – vocals
 Sonny West – composer
 Jack White – drums
 Jack White III – mixing, producer
 Paul "Wix" Wickens – piano
 Hal Willner – producer
 Yim Yames – producer
 Wilder Zoby – transfer assistant

Chart performance and recognitionRave On Buddy Holly peaked at number 15 on the Billboard 200. The album also reached number twenty-one on the Top Canadian Albums chart, number thirteen on the Top Digital Albums chart, and number two on the Top Rock Albums chart. "Dearest", performed by The Black Keys, received a nomination for Best Pop Duo/Group Performance at the 54th Grammy Awards (2012).

Release history

See alsoListen to Me: Buddy Holly, another tribute album to Holly released in 2011Just Tell Me That You Want Me: A Tribute to Fleetwood Mac, a 2012 tribute album also released by Hear Music as a follow-up to Rave On Buddy Holly''

References

External links
 Official site

2011 compilation albums
Buddy Holly tribute albums
Fantasy Records compilation albums
Hear Music compilation albums